This page shows the results of the 2015 FIBA CBC Championship, which was held in the city of Road Town, British Virgin Islands from June 15 to June 22, 2015.

Squads

Group stage

Group A

Group B

Final round

5th-8th place classification bracket

Medal bracket

5th-8th place classification playoffs

Semifinals

Final classification games

Ninth place game

Seventh place game

Fifth place game

Third place game

Final

Awards

Final standings

References
FIBA Archive

FIBA CBC Championship
2014–15 in North American basketball
2015 in British Virgin Islands sport
2015 in Caribbean sport
International basketball competitions hosted by the British Virgin Islands